"Crescent Moon" is Mika Nakashima's 2nd single. "Crescent Moon," which mixes 1980s style house with disco and Latin pop, was a 100,000 copies limited edition single, and it sold 98,570 copies, reaching #4 on the Oricon Weekly Top 200. The single was released on 6 February 2002.

Track listing
Crescent Moon
Destiny's Lotus
Amazing Grace
Crescent Moon [Instrumental]
Destiny's Lotus [Instrumental]

2002 singles
Mika Nakashima songs
Songs with lyrics by Takashi Matsumoto (lyricist)
Sony Music Entertainment Japan singles
2002 songs